Premio Presidente della Repubblica may refer to:

Premio Presidente della Repubblica (horse race), an Italian Group 2 horse race 
Premio Presidente della Repubblica (prize), scientific and artistic prizes awarded by the prestigious Italian academies Lincei National Academy, Accademia di San Luca, and the Accademia Nazionale di Santa Cecilia